Waipahihi or Waipahīhī is a suburb in Taupo, based on the eastern shores of Lake Taupō on New Zealand's North Island.

The local Waipahīhī Marae is a meeting place of the Ngāti Tūwharetoa hapū of Ngāti Hinerau and Ngāti Hineure. It includes the Kurapoto meeting house.

Demographics

Waipahihi had a population of 4,500 at the 2018 New Zealand census, an increase of 513 people (12.9%) since the 2013 census, and an increase of 585 people (14.9%) since the 2006 census. There were 1,689 households, comprising 2,250 males and 2,250 females, giving a sex ratio of 1.0 males per female, with 930 people (20.7%) aged under 15 years, 672 (14.9%) aged 15 to 29, 1,992 (44.3%) aged 30 to 64, and 906 (20.1%) aged 65 or older.

Ethnicities were 84.3% European/Pākehā, 20.9% Māori, 2.6% Pacific peoples, 3.2% Asian, and 2.3% other ethnicities. People may identify with more than one ethnicity.

The percentage of people born overseas was 17.2, compared with 27.1% nationally.

Although some people chose not to answer the census's question about religious affiliation, 54.0% had no religion, 34.4% were Christian, 1.5% had Māori religious beliefs, 0.7% were Hindu, 0.3% were Muslim, 0.7% were Buddhist and 1.1% had other religions.

Of those at least 15 years old, 645 (18.1%) people had a bachelor's or higher degree, and 549 (15.4%) people had no formal qualifications. 618 people (17.3%) earned over $70,000 compared to 17.2% nationally. The employment status of those at least 15 was that 1,833 (51.3%) people were employed full-time, 552 (15.5%) were part-time, and 90 (2.5%) were unemployed.

Education

References

Suburbs of Taupō
Populated places in Waikato
Populated places on Lake Taupō